Acidic leucine-rich nuclear phosphoprotein 32 family member C is a protein that in humans is encoded by the ANP32C gene.

Function 

Phosphoprotein 32 (PP32) is a tumor suppressor that can inhibit several types of cancers, including prostate and breast cancers. The protein encoded by this gene is one of at least two proteins that are similar in amino acid sequence to PP32 and are part of the same acidic nuclear phosphoprotein gene family. However, unlike PP32, the encoded protein is tumorigenic. The tumor suppressor function of PP32 has been localized to a 25 amino acid region that is divergent between PP32 and the protein encoded by this gene. This gene does not contain introns.

See also 
 ANP32A, ANP32B, ANP32D, ANP32E

References

Further reading